Mount Marrow is a rural locality in the City of Ipswich, Queensland, Australia.

History
Mount Marrow State School opened on 4 November 1909.

Education 
Mount Marrow State School is a government primary (Prep-6) school for boys and girls at 272 Thagoona-Haigslea Road. In 2017, the school had an enrolment of 66 students with 5 teachers (4 full-time equivalent) and 6 non-teaching staff (3 full-time equivalent).

References

City of Ipswich
Localities in Queensland